Panagiotis " Notis" Botsaris   (1756 – March 26, 1841) was a Souliote fighter and general in the Greek Revolution of 1821 . He was the son of the late Giorgis Botsaris and was the leader of the Souliote fara of the Botsari.

Life
Notis Botsaris was born in Souli in 1756. After the death of his brother Kitsos, he took over the leadership of the Botsari clan. Since Botsaris was a Suliote leader of the Botsaris farë it is presumed that his mother tongue was a dialect of Albanian.  During skirmishes with Ottomans in Agrafa he was wounded and captured, but after six months he managed to escape from the fortress of Këlcyrë where he was imprisoned. 

After the mediation of Ibrahim Pasha of Berati, a relative of Ali Pasha, he accepted to enter the service of Ali, on the condition that he stays in Kakolakkos Pogoniou. Ali Pasha invited him to Ioannina and allegedly sent him on a mission to Larissa, with the intention of setting an ambush for him in order to kill him on the way. However, Veli, son of Ali Pasha, warned him , and so Botsaris fled to Corfu. There he gathered the local Souliotes and incited them to head to Parga and from there to Preveza, to fight with the Ottoman troops against Ali Pasha. When after the fall of Preveza (1820) it was decided to besiege Ioannina, Botsaris and the Souliotes also took part, as revenge for Ali Pasha. The Sultan's commander-in-chief, however, did not keep the promise he had made to Botsaris, and instead of giving land to the Souliotes, he capitulated with Ali Pasha, turning his arms towards the Sultan's army and marching towards Souli.

He took part in the 3rd Assembly of Western Greece in the East. In Preveza, the house of Notis Botsaris, which he had acquired in 1806, was preserved until 1970. Notis Botsaris was honored by Othon with the rank of Lieutenant General. He died in Nafpaktos in 1841.

References

Souliotes
1756 births
1841 deaths